Fagundus is an extinct town in Forest and Warren counties, in the U.S. state of Pennsylvania.

History
Fagundus had its start in the 1860s during an area oil boom. The community was named after Charles Fagundus, a pioneer settler. A variant name was "Fagundus Corners".

References

Geography of Forest County, Pennsylvania
Geography of Warren County, Pennsylvania
Ghost towns in Pennsylvania